Isaac "Ike" Thomas Lassiter (November 15, 1940 – February 15, 2015) was an American college and professional football defensive lineman. He is an alumnus of St. Augustine's College in Raleigh, North Carolina, where he received a bachelor's degree in physical education. Lassiter played professionally for the American Football League's Denver Broncos and the AFL's Oakland Raiders, where he was an AFL All-Star in 1966.  He played as the starting left defensive end in Super Bowl II for the 1967 Raiders. In the 1967 regular season on a Raiders team with a won-lost record of 13–1, he was one of the main pass-rushers of a front four including Dan Birdwell, Tom Keating, and Ben Davidson  with a combined league-leading total of 67 sacks and 665 yards lost, the latter an all-time record, the all-time record for sacks being 72, done in a 16-game season, the Raiders leading the league in sacks from 1966 to 1968, an all-time record.

He ended his NFL career with the Boston / New England Patriots in 1970 and 1971. Lassiter was traded to the Washington Redskins in 1972, but did not make the team. He sat out the next two seasons, but played for the Jacksonville Sharks in 1974 in the World Football League. He retired to Oakland, California and died on February 15, 2015.

See also
 List of American Football League players

References

1940 births
2015 deaths
Boston Patriots players
Denver Broncos (AFL) players
New England Patriots players
Oakland Raiders players
Jacksonville Sharks (WFL) players
St. Augustine's Falcons football players
American Football League All-Star players
People from Wilson, North Carolina
American Football League players